Max Langer (born 11 July 1897 in Spitzkunnersdorf (Krs. Zittau); died 3 May 1985 in Niederoderwitz, was a German painter. After a few years of wandering through Bavaria and Munich he returned to Niederoderwitz.

External links

 
 

German painters
People from Zittau
1897 births
1985 deaths